Tongue tied refers to ankyloglossia, a medical condition in which the lingual frenulum is unusually short, causing restricted movement of the tongue.

Tongue-tie, tongue tied or tongue-tied can also refer to:

Literature 
Tongue-Tied (short story collection), a 2002 collection of short stories by Paul Jennings
"Tongue-Tied" a short story included in the collection
Tongue-Tied: How a Tiny String Under the Tongue Impacts Nursing, Speech, Feeding, and More, a 2018 non-fiction book by Dr. Richard Baxter
Tongue-Tied, a 1997 novel by Liselotte Marshall

Music 
"Tongue Tied" (Red Dwarf song), 1988
"Tongue Tied" (Boom Crash Opera song), 1995
"Tongue Tied" (Faber Drive song), 2007
"Tongue Tied" (Grouplove song), 2011
"Tongue Tied" (Marshmello, Yungblud and Blackbear song), 2019
"Tongue Tied" , a song by Eve 6 from their 1998 album Eve 6
"Tongue-Tied", a song by Earshot from their 2004 album Two
"Tongue Tied", a song by Status Quo from their 2007 album In Search of the Fourth Chord

Other uses 
Tongue-tie (tack), a piece of equipment sometimes used on racehorses
"Tongue-Tied" (Orange Is the New Black), a 2015 television episode
Miley Cyrus: Tongue Tied, a 2014 short film starring Miley Cyrus